Numerous video games were released in 2018. Best-selling games included Call of Duty: Black Ops 4, Marvel's Spider-Man, Red Dead Redemption 2, Super Smash Bros. Ultimate, Far Cry 5, God of War, Monster Hunter: World, and Dragon Ball FighterZ. Games highly regarded by video game critics released in 2018 included Red Dead Redemption 2, God of War, Super Smash Bros. Ultimate, Marvel's Spider-Man, Forza Horizon 4, Monster Hunter: World, Dead Cells, Return of the Obra Dinn, and Celeste. The year's highest-grossing games included Fortnite, Honor of Kings/Arena of Valor, Dungeon Fighter Online, League of Legends, and Pokémon Go.

Among major trends in 2018 included the explosive growth of battle royale games such as Bluehole's PlayerUnknown's Battlegrounds and Epic Games' Fortnite Battle Royale, the resurgence of Pokémon Go, ongoing governmental review of loot boxes in light of national gambling restrictions, Sony Interactive Entertainment agreeing to allow cross-platform play between PlayStation 4 and other console users, and the entry of Fortnite-related internet memes into popular culture. With Fortnites success, Epic was able to establish the Epic Games Store for personal computers as a strong competitor to the dominant but criticized position held by Valve's Steam digital storefront by significantly increasing the revenue split it gave to developers. Additionally, with a number of major sudden studio closures, including Telltale Games, there was an increasing call for video game developers to unionize. A nearly year-long freeze on video game approvals by the Chinese government had a major impact on publishers Tencent and NetEase, and is expected to impact future revenues in the industry.

Top-rated games

Major awards

Critically acclaimed games
Metacritic is an aggregator of video game journalism reviews. It generally considers expansions and re-releases as separate entities.

Financial performance 
According to industry analysis firm NewZoo, the video game industry was worth  by revenues in 2018, a 10.9% growth over 2017. Of this, 47% of the revenues were generated from mobile gaming, with consoles taking 28% and personal computers taking the remaining 25%. The top five largest video game markets of 2018 were China, the United States, Japan, South Korea, and Germany.

Of that,  were from software sales, digital content, and subscriptions.

Licensed merchandise based on video game franchises generated $20.68 billion in 2018 retail sales, a rise of 6.1% compared to 2017.

Highest-grossing games
The following were 2018's top ten highest-grossing video games in terms of worldwide digital revenue (including digital purchases, microtransactions, free-to-play and pay-to-play) across all platforms (including mobile, PC and console platforms). Six of the top ten highest-grossing games are published or owned by Tencent, including the top five titles.

The video game franchise that has generated the highest licensed merchandise sales is Pokémon. Other video game franchises with significant licensed merchandise sales include Sonic the Hedgehog, Mario, Call of Duty, Overwatch, Roblox, Halo, Fortnite and Minecraft.

Best-selling games by region
The following were 2018's top ten best-selling video games by region, in terms of software units sold (excluding microtransactions and free-to-play titles) on PC and console platforms, for the United States, Japan, and Europe.

Major events

Notable deaths

 March 3 – David Ogden Stiers, 75, voice actor best known for the voice of Doctor Jumba Jookiba in the "Lilo & Stitch" franchise.
 May 24 – TotalBiscuit, 33, English video gaming commentator and game critic on YouTube.
 September 6 – Burt Reynolds, 82, voice actor known for the voice of Avery Carrington in "Grand Theft Auto: Vice City".

Hardware releases

Game releases

Series with new entries
Series with new installments in 2018 include Anno, Assassin's Creed, Battlefield, Bloons Tower Defense, Bayonetta, Bit.Trip, BlazBlue, Bomberman, Call of Duty, Darksiders, Digimon, Donkey Kong, Dragon Ball, Dynasty Warriors, Earth Defense Force, Fallout, Far Cry, Forza, God of War, Hitman, Just Cause, Kirby, Life Is Strange, Mario Party, Mario Tennis, Mega Man, Monster Hunter, Ni no Kuni, Persona, Pillars of Eternity, Pokémon, Red Dead, Sakura Wars, Science Adventure,  Shantae, Soulcalibur, Spider-Man, Spyro, State of Decay, Super Smash Bros., The Bard's Tale, The Crew, The Walking Dead, Tomb Raider, Tropico, Valkyria Chronicles, Warhammer, and Wolfenstein

January–March

April–June

July–September

October–December

Video game-based film and television releases

See also
2018 in games

References

Notes
 The release date is for Japan only.
 A western or worldwide release of previously regional exclusive games.
 These games were targeted to be released in fiscal year 2018, which began on April 1, 2018, and ended on March 31, 2019.

Footnotes

 
Video games by year
Video games
Technology timelines by year